Into the Purple Valley is the second studio album by roots rock musician Ry Cooder, released in 1972. 

The album's front cover is listed at number 12 on Rolling Stone'''s 100 Greatest Album Covers. It shows Cooder and his then wife, Susan Titelman, in a Buick convertible at the Warner Bros. film lot in Burbank, California.

Critical receptionRecord Collector'' wrote that the album "reached deep into tradition, unearthing neglected treasures from America’s past and reshaping them for the post-Woodstock generation."

Track listing

Side One
"How Can You Keep On Moving (Unless You Migrate Too)" (Agnes "Sis" Cunningham) – 2:25
"Billy the Kid" (Traditional; arranged by Ry Cooder) – 3:45
"Money Honey" (Jesse Stone) – 3:28
"FDR in Trinidad" (Fitz McLean) – 3:01
"Teardrops Will Fall" (Gerry "Dickey Doo" Granahan, Marion Smith) – 3:03
"Denomination Blues" (George Washington Phillips) – 3:58

Side Two
"On a Monday" (Lead Belly) – 2:52
"Hey Porter" (Johnny Cash) – 4:34
"Great Dream from Heaven" (instrumental) (Joseph Spence) – 1:53
"Taxes on the Farmer Feeds Us All" (Traditional; arranged by Ry Cooder) – 3:52
"Vigilante Man" (Woody Guthrie) – 4:15

(Note: "Billy the Kid" was actually composed by Woody Guthrie, and "Taxes on the Farmer Feeds Us All" by Fiddlin' John Carson.)

Personnel
Ry Cooder – guitars, mandolin, vocals
Van Dyke Parks – keyboards
Gloria Jones – vocals
Claudia Lennear – vocals
George Bohanon – horns
John Craviotto – drums
Joe Lane Davis – horns
Jim Dickinson – piano
Chris Ethridge – bass
Milt Holland – percussion
Jerry Jumonville – saxophone
Fritz Richmond – washtub bass
Donna Washburn – vocals
Donna Weiss – vocals
Ike Williams – horns
Technical
Mike Salisbury - cover design
Marty Evans - cover photography

Billboard charts

References

1972 albums
Ry Cooder albums
Albums produced by Lenny Waronker
Albums produced by Jim Dickinson
Reprise Records albums